The men's 5000 metres at the 2012 European Athletics Championships was held at the Helsinki Olympic Stadium on 27 June.

Medalists

Records

Schedule

Results

Final

References

 Final Results

5000
5000 metres at the European Athletics Championships